Lyudmyla Nikolaevna Kuchma (née Talalayeva (Талалаєва); June 19, 1940 in Votkinsk) is the wife of second Ukrainian President Leonid Kuchma and a former First Lady of Ukraine. She had previously worked as a design engineer.

Biography
She was born in Udmurtia, and studied at a music school located in the house-museum of Pyotr Tchaikovsky (also born in Votkinsk). She graduated from mechanical college.

Since 1967, she has been married to Leonid Kuchma. Her daughter Olena was born in 1970.

For thirty years, she worked as an engineer in the design office of a production association in Dnepropetrovsk. Since 1996, she has been Honorary President of the National Fund for Social Protection of Mother and Child.

Kuchma was awarded the Order of the Lithuanian Grand Duke Gediminas (1998) and Order of Princess Olga First Class (2010). She has a number of other awards of Ukrainian and foreign public organizations for charitable activities.

Since May 12, 2004, she has been Special Ambassador of UNESCO to help young talents.

References

External links
  Украина-детям

1940 births
Living people
People from Votkinsk
First Ladies of Ukraine
Soviet engineers
20th-century Ukrainian engineers
Recipients of the Order of Princess Olga, 1st class
Grand Crosses of the Order of the Lithuanian Grand Duke Gediminas
Grand Cross of the Order of Civil Merit
Ukrainian philanthropists
Ukrainian women engineers
20th-century women philanthropists
Kuchma family